Miha Hrobat  (born 3 February 1995) is a Slovenian alpine skier who competes internationally.

He participated in the 2018 Winter Olympics.

World Cup results

References

External links 
 

1995 births
Living people
Slovenian male alpine skiers
Olympic alpine skiers of Slovenia
Alpine skiers at the 2018 Winter Olympics
Alpine skiers at the 2022 Winter Olympics
Alpine skiers at the 2012 Winter Youth Olympics